Estate of Panic is an American reality competition show in which seven strangers compete to find cash in a large estate. The show is hosted by Steve Valentine, and produced by Endemol USA.

The first and only season aired on the Sci-Fi Channel from November 12 to December 17, 2008, around the same time as another reality competition series, Chase. The series has also aired on USA Network and Chiller.

Premise
Seven strangers from across the United States arrive at a large, mysterious mansion. The mansion's eccentric owner (Steve Valentine) spends his free time stashing his assets throughout the mansion, and he is assisted by his silent butler, the eighty-year-old maniacal freak, Rupert.  Once the players arrive at the estate, The owner challenges them to find the cash he has hidden in a series of rooms. The task is made difficult, however, as the contestants must come face to face with their greatest phobias while in the house. In each room, the last person to leave and the person who collects the least money are both eliminated. After three rooms are explored and six players have been eliminated, the final contestant earns the opportunity to win (and add to) everything collected by all players by completing a final challenge in the estate's Vault.

Gameplay

Main game
The game is similar in concept to several other shows such as Fear Factor (also produced by Endemol), the Nickelodeon game show Finders Keepers, the French game show Fort Boyard, the British game show The Crystal Maze, and the GSN game show How Much Is Enough?  The seven contestants search through a series of three rooms for cash.  Bills of smaller denominations ($1, $5, etc.) are hidden in relatively easy locations in the rooms, or even placed out in plain sight; bills of larger denominations (up to $100) are hidden in areas that are either more difficult to reach or protected by various animals (snakes, crabs, spiders, maggots, insects, etc.), all of which are harmless, yet disturbing.  Meanwhile, each room takes on a life of its own to make things trickier and scarier for the contestants. For example, the basement floods with water; the study has moving walls and ceiling that "shrink" the room to a very small size; the floor in the kitchen has properties similar to quicksand, and the garden is rigged with electric fences.

Once a contestant believes that he or she has enough money to secure a spot in the next round, the player must leave the room and place all cash collected on a tray held by Rupert.  Not all exits remain open the entire time, however, and a contestant might either have to wait for an exit to unlock or take an alternate route to make it out of the room in time.

Elimination
While there is no explicitly-stated time limit in any of the rooms, the rooms become more uninhabitable as time passes and the number of players shrinks, forcing the players to consider when to exit. In each round, the last player left in the room is eliminated; the show claims that the contestant is "trapped" inside once all the others have exited.  In addition: of the contestants who did exit, the one who recovered the least money is also eliminated and escorted from the house by the butler. Should there be a tie for last place, both players advance, but the two players with the least money in the next room are eliminated in addition to the trapped player.

There is no reward for recovering the most money in the first room, but the person who does so in the second room usually receives assistance that may prove useful in the third room.  The total money recovered by all eliminated contestants is placed in a cumulative pot, which is then offered as a prize to the last remaining contestant.

Extras
At times, a monetary bonus is offered to a contestant who can retrieve a certain object or set of objects hidden in one of the rooms.  Depending on the object, it could either help or hinder the player's actual progress in the room: carrying some objects around could impede the player's progress, while setting them down would put them at risk of being stolen, with the others have the ability grab the rest without letting go.  Other hidden objects could be worn to protect the player against some unwanted distraction(s) in the room (i.e. rubber-soled slippers, to protect against electric shocks).

The Vault
The last remaining contestant is given the chance to win all the money recovered by all seven contestants, plus more, in the Vault.

The contestant is restrained (such as by a leg chain, a harness suspended from the ceiling, or a straitjacket) in a vault containing 200 "safety deposit boxes."  Some boxes contain cash, while others have worthless items or booby traps such as snakes; a few boxes contain tools the contestant can use to free himself from the restraint.

Unlike the previous rooms, the Vault features a time limit: ten steel balls roll at intervals through a "timing device." Once eight balls have finished dropping, red lights begin flashing to warn the contestant; when all ten have finished dropping, the door locks. If the contestant exits the Vault before the door locks, he or she wins all the money collected that night, plus any money recovered from the Vault. If the door locks, he/she loses all of the money.

As a last resort, the contestant can choose to "panic," pressing a button in the corner of the vault to summon Valentine to the rescue. Alternatively, if the contestant cannot physically reach the button, he/she may shout out, "I'm panicking," to the same effect; in earlier episodes, Valentine told the contestant to do both. A contestant who panics forfeits any money collected in the vault as well as half of the money collected in the first three rooms.

If the contestant makes it out of the Vault, (regardless if they completed or forfeited by "panicking"), The host will state the final amount of prize money the contestant is leaving with, before ordering them to leave with the catchphrase of "Get out of my house". The winning contestant then leaves the mansion and is escorted away from the estate via car.

Production
Estate of Panic is filmed on an estate in Argentina, although some challenges are filmed in a studio because, according to Valentine, "the scope of the challenges is so ambitious and huge that there were times when we couldn't really destroy that person's house." A disclaimer at the end of each episode notes that only one challenge is filmed per day, and the complete show is filmed over the course of four days.

International versions

Episodes

Reaction
Brian Lowry in Variety praised host Valentine's "macabre charm" but stated the show overall is a "parade of silly stunts and contests" which becomes "mostly an ordeal for viewers."

References

External links

Syfy original programming
2000s American reality television series
2008 American television series debuts
2008 American television series endings
Television series by Endemol